Émile Ollivier (February 19, 1940 – November 10, 2002) was a Haitian-born educator and writer living in Quebec, Canada. He was considered one of the most important Haitian writers of his time.

He was born in Port-au-Prince and, after studying at the Lycée in Port-au-Prince, went on to study philosophy at the École normale supérieure d'Haïti and literature and psychology in France. Following the rise to power by François Duvalier, Ollivier left Haiti for France in 1964. In 1965, he came to Quebec, first settling in Amos in the Abitibi-Témiscamingue region, where he taught school, and later moving to Montreal. Ollivier worked as a coordinator for the Quebec Ministry of Education from 1973 to 1976. From 1977 to 1980, he was an administrator at the Université du Québec à Montréal. He was a professor of andragogy in the Education Sciences department of the Université de Montréal for 25 years.

He married Marie-José Glémaud.

In 1993, Ollivier was named a Chevalier in the National Order of Quebec. In 2000, he was named a Chevalier in the French Ordre des Arts et des Lettres and was named a member of the Académie des lettres du Québec.

He died in Montreal at the age of 62. He was entombed at the Sainte-Marguerite-d'Youville  Mausoleum at the Notre Dame des Neiges Cemetery in Montreal.

The  was established by the Quebec Conseil supérieur de la langue française in 2004 and was awarded until 2014.

Selected works 
 1946/1976: Trente ans de Pouvoir Noir en Haïti, essay (1976), with Cary Hector and Claude Moïse
 Paysage de l'aveugle, stories (1977)
 Mère-solitude, novel (1983), received the Prix Jacques Roumain
 La discorde aux cents voix, novel (1986), received the Grand Prix de la prose from Le Journal de Montréal
 Passages, novel (1991), received the 
 Repenser Haïti; grandeur et misères d'un mouvement démocratique, essay (1992), with Claude Moïse
 Les urnes scellées, novel (1995), received the Prix Carbet de la Caraïbe et du Tout-Monde
 Mille Eaux, novel (1999)
 Repérages, essay (2001), was a finalist for a Governor General's Award for Literary Merit
 La Brûlerie, novel (2005), published after his death

References 

1940 births
2002 deaths
20th-century Haitian novelists
Haitian male novelists
Haitian essayists
Canadian male essayists
Haitian male short story writers
Haitian short story writers
People from Port-au-Prince
Academic staff of the Université de Montréal
Canadian novelists in French
Haitian expatriates in Canada
Knights of the National Order of Quebec
Chevaliers of the Ordre des Arts et des Lettres
20th-century Canadian novelists
Canadian male novelists
20th-century Canadian male writers
20th-century Canadian essayists
Burials at Notre Dame des Neiges Cemetery